Gary Stewart is the name of:
 Gary Stewart (folk singer), Scottish folk singer
 Gary Stewart (country singer) (1944–2003), American country musician
 Gary L. Stewart (born 1953), imperator of AMORC from 1987 to 1990
 Gary Stewart (politician) (born 1938), politician in Ontario
 Gary Stewart (basketball) (born 1961), American college basketball coach
 Gary Loyd Stewart, American author, engineer and businessman
 Gary Stewart, protagonist in The House of the Dead 2
 Gary Stewart (musician), see Yezda Urfa
 Gary Stewart (music executive) (1957-2019), American music executive

See also
 Garry Stewart (born 1962), artistic director of Australian Dance Theater
 Gareth Stewart (born 1980), English footballer